Naruheh (also Romanized as Nārūheh; also known as Nārūneh) is a village in Lajran Rural District, in the Central District of Garmsar County, Semnan Province, Iran. At the 2006 census, its population was 16, in 4 families.

References 

Populated places in Garmsar County